Pablito de Cádiz (1908–January 24, 2004) was a Spanish flamenco dancer (bailaor).  His real name was Pablo Jiménez Pérez, and he was a celebrity in flamenco cafés (tablaos) with his estilos festeros (reveller styles).  His brother Gineto de Cádiz was also a famous dancer, as were other members of his family.

Biography 
He was the brother of Juan Jiménez Pérez (El Gineto de Cádiz) and is also related to Perla de Cádiz. 

He worked along La Argentinita, joining her dance company at age 18. After the war, he performed with Canalejas de Puerto Real, Niño de Marchena, Manolo Caracol, Lola Flores and Rita Ortega; touring across Spain. He died in 2004 in Cádiz, where he had been established since 1969.

References

1908 births
People from Cádiz
Flamenco dancers
Spanish male dancers
Year of death missing